Antonios Mastoras (born January 6, 1991) is a Greek high jumper. He took the fourth place at the 2013 European Indoor Championships in Gothenburg and won the bronze medal, the same year, at the European U23 Championships in Tampere.

Competition record

Personal life 

He hails from Neo Petritsi, Serres.

References
http://www.all-athletics.com/node/41766 

1991 births
Living people
Greek male high jumpers
Athletes (track and field) at the 2016 Summer Olympics
Olympic athletes of Greece
Athletes (track and field) at the 2013 Mediterranean Games
Mediterranean Games competitors for Greece
21st-century Greek people